Spencer Nolan "Spenny" Rice (born April 14, 1963) is a Canadian screenwriter, filmmaker and television personality. He was the co-star of the reality comedy series Kenny vs. Spenny along with Kenny Hotz.

Personal life 
Rice was born on April 14, 1963 to a secular Jewish family, the only son of Vincent Rice (d. 2003), and Corrine Rice (19332021).

Rice attended Crescent School, a Toronto boys' independent school, for elementary school and then went to high school at Forest Hill Collegiate Institute. Rice studied film studies at Glendon College, York University in Toronto. Growing up Rice took classes at the improvisational comedy enterprise Second City and played hockey for his high school.

Career 

After graduating from university, Rice worked as a production coordinator and independent filmmaker.

In 1993, Rice directed a short film entitled Telewhore, a documentary about a phone sex girl. It was exhibited at The Toronto International Film Festival and was well-received by critics. In 1994, Rice and Kenny Hotz, who had been friends since childhood, collaborated on the short film It Don't Cost Nothin' to Say Good Morning. Their first feature-length film was Pitch in 1997, which won Best Film Award from the Toronto Independent Arts Festival. In 2000, Rice directed, produced and wrote a short film for TV entitled Something Anything which won a Telefest Independent Television Festival award for best comedy. There was interest from the television station that had broadcast the short film and turn it into a TV series, but the idea was later scrapped.

In 2003, Rice and Hotz created the show Kenny vs. Spenny, which finished its sixth season in 2010 and ended with an hour-long series finale on December 23, 2010. The show aired in many different countries and was nominated for Gemini Awards in 2004, 2005, 2006, and 2008, it even caught the attention of South Park creators Trey Parker and Matt Stone who became executive producers of the show during season 4.

In 2008, Spencer Rice wrote and starred in the mockumentary film Confessions of a Porn Addict in which he played the character Mark Tobias.

Rice's next project was called Single White Spenny. He played himself; it was cancelled after one season due to low ratings.

In November 2020, along with Kenny Hotz, Rice wrote and produced Kenny & Spenny: Paldemic, a CBC Gem special that focused on the pair's friendship and careers since Kenny vs. Spenny ended in 2010.

Filmography

Soundtrack

Awards and nominations

References

External links 
Official website at Spenny.TV (archived)

Comedians from Toronto
Male actors from Toronto
Canadian television personalities
Jewish Canadian male actors
Living people
Writers from Toronto
York University alumni
Jewish Canadian comedians
Jewish male comedians
Canadian sketch comedians
1963 births
Canadian male comedians
21st-century Canadian comedians
Glendon College alumni